Wilfred George Fell (15 April 1879 – 11 April 1920) was an Australian rules footballer who played with Collingwood in the Victorian Football League (VFL).

Originally from Tungamah Football Club, Fell made his senior VFL debut in the 1899 VFL season, playing seven games for Collingwood before leaving the club at the end of the season.

Notes

External links 

		
Wilfred Fell's profile at Collingwood Forever

1879 births
1920 deaths
Australian rules footballers from Victoria (Australia)
Collingwood Football Club players